is a funicular station in Ikoma, Nara Prefecture, Japan.

Line 
 ■ Kintetsu Ikoma Cable Line (Y21)

Layout 
Passengers can get on and off a cable car only to and from the right side of the direction for Hozanji in regular operations. The opposite platform is usually closed.

Surroundings
This station is next to Ikoma Sanjo Amusument Park. The TV masts of Osaka's TV stations (MBS, ABC, TV Osaka, Kansai TV, Yomiuri TV) and the radio masts of business radio are located on the ridge of Mount Ikoma.

Adjacent stations 

Railway stations in Japan opened in 1927
Railway stations in Nara Prefecture